The women's 100m metres was an event at the 1984 Summer Olympics in Los Angeles, California. The final was held on August 5, 1984.

Results

Heats

The heats were held on 1984-08-04.

Heat 1

Heat 2

Heat 3

Heat 4

Heat 5

Heat 6

Quarterfinals

The quarterfinals were held on 1984-08-04.

Quarterfinal 1

Quarterfinal 2

Quarterfinal 3

Quarterfinal 4

Semifinals

The semifinals were held on 1984-08-05.

Semifinal 1

Semifinal 2

Final

See also
 1983 Women's World Championships 100 metres (Helsinki)
 1984 Friendship Games 100 metres (Prague)
 1986 Women's European Championships 100 metres (Stuttgart)

References

External links
 Results
 Results

 
100 metres at the Olympics
1984 in women's athletics
Women's events at the 1984 Summer Olympics